Winter in June is an EP released by the heavy metal band Kiuas, released on May 29, 2004 by the Rage of Achilles label. This release would secure Kiuas for a deal with Spinefarm Records. The songs; "Warrior Soul" and "Across the Snows" were demo versions on; the first demo The Discipline of Steel, the second demo, Born Under the Northern Lights and were later released on The Spirit of Ukko album.

Track listing 
 "Winter in June" − 4:24
 "Warrior Soul" − 6:32
 "Song for the Fells" − 5:02
 "Across the Snows" − 6:00

Credits 
 All music and lyrics by Mikko Salovaara.
 All songs arranged and produced by Kiuas.
 Recorded and mixed at Studio Tauko by Atte Tanskanen and Yrjo Buckbee in October / November 2003.
 Mastered at Finnvox Studios by Mika Jussila.
 Artwork and layout by Jarno Lahti.
 Kiuas logo by ToxicAngel.
 Band photo by Junnu Laine.

Kiuas albums
2004 EPs